Garra ornata was frequently misidentified as G. waterloti.

Garra waterloti is a species of ray-finned fish in the genus Garra from west Africa.

References

Garra
Taxa named by Jacques Pellegrin
Fish described in 1935
Fish of West Africa